The second season of Degrassi: Next Class premiered on July 19, 2016 on Family Channel under the teen block F2N in Canada and began streaming internationally on July 22, 2016 on Netflix. The season made its debut in Australia on May 30, 2016 and concluded on June 10, 2016.

Synopsis
This season picked up where the last season left off as it continues to follow the Sophomores and Juniors as they enter into the second semester, as they still try to navigate high school drama with groundbreaking stories such as racism, major depressive disorder, oppositional defiant disorder, transgender rights, sex, protest, self-harm, sexual identity, cystic fibrosis, Police brutality, BDD and Self-image.

Cast

Series regulars 
The second season has nineteen actors receiving star billing with all nineteen of them returning from the previous season.

Amanda Arcuri as Lola Pacini (9 episodes)
Amir Bageria as Baaz Nahir (6 episodes)
Soma Bhatia as Goldi Nahir (6 episodes)
Jamie Bloch as Yael Baron (5 episodes)
Stefan Brogren as Archie "Snake" Simpson (2 episodes)
Chelsea Clark as Esme Song (5 episodes)
Reiya Downs as Shaylynn "Shay" Powers (9 episodes)
Ana Golja as Zoë Rivas (9 episodes)
Nikki Gould as Grace Cardinal (9 episodes)
Ricardo Hoyos as Zigmund "Zig" Novak (9 episodes)
Ehren Kassam as Jonah Haak (7 episodes)
André Kim as Winston "Chewy" Chu (7 episodes)
Lyle Lettau as Tristan Milligan (8 episodes)
Spencer MacPherson as Hunter Hollingsworth (6 episodes)
Eric Osborne as Miles Hollingsworth (9 episodes)
Dante Scott as Vijay Maraj (6 episodes)
Olivia Scriven  as Maya Matlin (8 episodes)
Sara Waisglass as Francesca "Frankie" Hollingsworth (9 episodes)
Richard Walters as Deon "Tiny" Bell (9 episodes)

Supporting cast

Alumni
Jamie Johnston as Peter Stone (4 episodes)
Raymond Ablack as Savtaj "Sav" Bhandari (2 episodes)
Shane Kippel as Gavin "Spinner" Mason (2 episodes)
Charlotte Arnold as Holly J. Sinclair (1 episode)
Sarah Barrable-Tishauer as Liberty Van Zandt (1 episode)
Lauren Collins as Paige Michalchuk (1 episode)
Jake Epstein as Craig Manning (1 episode)
Miriam McDonald as Emma Nelson-Mason (1 episode)
Jacob Neayem as Mohammed "Mo" Mashkour (1 episode)
Adamo Ruggiero as Marco Del Rossi (1 episode)

Parents & Faculty 
Stephanie Moore as Mrs. Diana Hollingsworth (5 episodes)
Michael Brown as Mr. Blake Mitchell (4 episodes)
Aisha Alfa as Ms. Grell (3 episodes)
Michael Kinney as Coach Darryl Armstrong (2 episodes)
Elle Downs as Mrs. Powers (1 episode)
Sterling Jarvis as Mr. Powers (1 episode)
Cheri Maracle as Ms. Cardinal (1 episode)
Tom Melissis as Mr. Dom Perino (1 episode)

Students & Guest Stars
Clarissa Anson as Kara (4 episodes)

Production
After the cancellation of Degrassi's 14-season run on TeenNick, Nickelodeon passed on the pitch for Degrassi: Next Class. This reboot of the series was later picked up by Netflix and is considered a stand-alone series for a new generation—a new incarnation. This season was filmed along with season 1. The show was given a 20 episode order with the episodes being split into two seasons on Netflix and Family. Filming for the two seasons began in June 2015 and wrapped early September the same year.

This season featured the 500th episode of the Degrassi franchise which in turn featured an alumni reunion with characters from Degrassi: The Next Generation. Confirmed guest appearances are Adamo Ruggiero as Marco Del Rossi, Miriam McDonald as Emma Nelson, Lauren Collins as Paige Michalchuk, Shane Kippel as Gavin "Spinner" Mason, and Sarah Barrable-Tishauer as Liberty Van Zandt. Several others are also expected to return. Appearing throughout the season will be former cast member Jamie Johnston who portrayed Peter Stone from seasons five through ten of Degrassi: The Next Generation. He first appears in the premiere.

During May 2016, Australian network ABC3 began releasing episode titles and descriptions for this season, two months before its premiere in the United States and Canada. A week after the first season concluded on the network, it began airing this season on May 30, 2016. This will be the first time in the Degrassi franchise history that an entire season airs in a foreign country before its release in Canada and the U.S. The season will run for 2 weeks on ABC3 and use the telenovela/soap opera format incorporated in the later seasons of Degrassi.

In Canada, the season premiered on July 19, 2016, on Family Channel's F2N block. Unlike the previous season, it will air for 10-weeks and move to Tuesday's at 9:45 PM ET/PT.  Also, due to the season premiering in Australia beforehand, Family released the entire season on July 22, 2016, on its subscription-based Family Channel App alongside Netflix's release.

Episodes

: ABC3 in Australia aired the season before both Family Channel in Canada and Netflix internationally.

References

External links
 List of Degrassi: Next Class episodes at IMDB.

Degrassi (franchise)
2016 Canadian television seasons